Roberto Premier (born 1958) is an Italian former professional basketball player and basketball coach. At a height of 1.97 m (6 ft 5  in) tall, he played at the shooting guard and small forward positions. He was the FIBA Saporta Cup Finals Top Scorer, in 1984.

Professional career
Premier played with Gorizia Pallacanestro (1978–1981), Olimpia Milano (1981–1989), and Pallacanestro Virtus Roma (1989–1994). Premier won 5 Italian League championships (1982, 1985, 1986, 1987, 1989), 2 Italian Cups (1986, 1987), 2 FIBA European Champions Cup (EuroLeague) titles (1987, 1988), 1 FIBA Korać Cup (1985), and 1 FIBA Intercontinental Cup (1987), while playing with Olimpia Milano. While playing with Pallacanestro Virtus Roma, he won the FIBA Korać Cup (1992).

Italian national team
Premier played with the senior Italian national basketball team at the EuroBasket 1985, where he won a bronze medal, at the EuroBasket 1991, where he won a silver medal. He also played at the 1984 Summer Olympic Games, and at the 1986 FIBA World Championship.

References

External links 
FIBA Profile
FIBA Europe Profile
Italian League Profile 

1958 births
Living people
Basketball players at the 1984 Summer Olympics
Italian basketball coaches
Italian men's basketball players
Olimpia Milano players
Olympic basketball players of Italy
Pallacanestro Virtus Roma players
Shooting guards
Small forwards
1986 FIBA World Championship players